Nightflight to Venus is the third studio album by Euro-Caribbean group Boney M., and was released in July 1978. The album became a major success in continental Europe, Scandinavia, and Canada, topping most of the album charts during the second half of 1978 and also became their first UK number one album. In Canada, it received a nomination for a 1980 Juno Award in a category 'International Album of the Year'.

Nightflight to Venus includes the worldwide hits "Rivers of Babylon" and "Brown Girl in the Ring", a double A-sided single that topped the UK singles chart and has sold over 2 million copies there. The follow-up was another Boney M. classic, "Rasputin", in most countries also a double A-side coupled with "Painter Man", a cover of a 1966 hit by the band The Creation. In the UK, "Rasputin" and "Painter Man" were released separately as A-sides by Atlantic Records, both reaching the Top 10. "Rivers of Babylon", which peaked at No. 30 on The Billboard Hot 100, became their biggest US hit.

Album information 

In Europe and most other parts of the world, the album was followed in November 1978 by the Christmas single, "Mary's Boy Child/Oh My Lord" backed with "Dancing in the Streets", another chart topper – selling over 1.86 million copies in the UK alone. Upon its original 1978 release, these two tracks did not appear on Nightflight to Venus, but they were included on later CD releases of the album (except not on the 1994 CD release).

There were four different pressings of the original Hansa Records vinyl LP, all with slightly different versions of some tracks. The most significant difference was the length of the title track, "Nightflight to Venus". On the very first German pressing, it was 7:09 minutes, making the segued medley with the also extended "Rasputin" 13:48 in total, the second pressing 5:55, the third 4:58 and the final 4:46 – this version being the one appearing on the UK and US editions. 

The timings given here are those of the 1994 and 2007 CD re-issues.
Also only on the first pressing ‘Rasputin' has a unique instrumental part within the last verse. So later pressings contain a slightly shorter version.

A different mix for "He Was A Steppenwolf" and a slightly different version of "Voodoonight" was used on the first pressing only compared to the latter ones.

Track listing

Side A 
 "Nightflight to Venus" (Frank Farian, Fred Jay, Dietmar Kawohl) – 4:46
 "Rasputin" (Frank Farian, Fred Jay, George Reyam (Hans-Jörg Mayer)) – 5:51
 "Painter Man" (Eddie Phillips, Kenny Pickett) – 3:10
 "He Was a Steppenwolf" (Frank Farian, Fred Jay, Stefan Klinkhammer) – 6:51
 "King of the Road" (Roger Miller) – 2:35

Side B 
 "Rivers of Babylon" (Brent Dowe, Trevor McNaughton, Frank Farian, George Reyam) – 4:18
 "Voodoonight" (Giorgio Sgarbi) – 3:31
 "Brown Girl in the Ring" (Traditional; arranged by Frank Farian) – 4:02
 "Never Change Lovers in the Middle of the Night" (Mats Björklund, Keith Forsey, Fred Jay) – 5:32
 "Heart of Gold" (Neil Young) – 4:00

Personnel 
 Liz Mitchell – lead vocals (A3, B1, B3, B5), backing vocals
 Marcia Barrett – lead vocals (A1, A5, B4), backing vocals
 Frank Farian – lead vocals (A2, B2), backing vocals
 Bill Swisher – robot voice on A1, narrator on A2
 The Rhythm Machine – musicians
 Keith Forsey – drums
 Nick Woodland – guitar
 Mats Björklund – guitar
 Gary Unwin – bass guitar
 "Chico" de los Reyes – keyboards
 Bernd Kohn – marimba, percussion

Production 
 Frank Farian – producer
 Christian Kolonovits – arranger
 Johan Daansen – arranger
 Mats Björklund – arranger
 Michael Cretu – arranger
 Stefan Klinkhammer – arranger
 Fred Schreier – sound engineer
 Hartmut Pfannmüller – sound engineer
 John Lund – sound engineer
 Tammy Grohé – sound engineer
 Manfred Vormstein – art direction
 Didi Zill – photography
 Dengler/Kohlmeier – design
 Recorded at Europasound Studios, Offenbach and Union Studios, Munich
 Mixed at Europasound Studios, Offenbach

Charts

Weekly charts

Year-end charts

Certifications and sales

Reissued
 1994: CD, BMG, 74321 21269 2 
 2007: CD, Sony BMG Music Entertainment, 88697082622
 2011: Boney M. Original Album Classics, 5 CD, Sony Music, 88697928702
 2017: Boney M. Complete, 9 LP, Sony Music, 88985406971

References

External links 
 Rate Your Music, detailed discography
 Discogs.com, detailed discography
 [ Allmusic, biography, discography etc.]

1978 albums
Boney M. albums
Albums produced by Frank Farian
Atlantic Records albums
Hansa Records albums
Sire Records albums